Madrone is a census-designated place in Valencia County, New Mexico, United States. Its population was 707 as of the 2010 census. New Mexico State Road 304 passes through the community.

Geography

Demographics

Education
Its school district is Belén Consolidated Schools. Belén High School is the district's comprehensive high school.

References

Census-designated places in New Mexico
Census-designated places in Valencia County, New Mexico